Vitaliy Vergeles (born 15 November 1989) is a Ukrainian sprint canoeist. He is World champion and multiple World Championships medalist. He is also a multiple medalist of the European Championships.

References

External links

Ukrainian male canoeists
Living people
ICF Canoe Sprint World Championships medalists in Canadian
1989 births
Universiade medalists in canoeing
Universiade gold medalists for Ukraine
Universiade silver medalists for Ukraine
Medalists at the 2013 Summer Universiade
Sportspeople from Lviv
21st-century Ukrainian people